Aunt Mary is a Norwegian prog rock band from the 1970s.

They signed a recording contract with Polydor Records in Denmark, to facilitate the release of Aunt Mary in 1970. The group gradually moved towards progressive rock with the records Loaded in 1972 and Janus in 1973. The group disbanded in 1973, but has reunited for several concerts since 1978.

The band's former lead vocalist, Jan Groth, died from cancer on 27 August 2014, at the age of 68.

The band toured the US in 2019

Musicians
Jan Groth - Vocals, keyboards, guitar
Bjørn Kristiansen - Guitar, vocals
Svein Gundersen - Bass, piano, vocals
Ketil Stensvik - Drums, vocals
Bengt Jenssen - Keyboards
Eirikur Hauksson - Bass
Per Ivar Fure - Flute, sax, vocals
Ivan Lauritzen - Drums
Øystein Selenius Olsen - Bass

Discography
Studio albums
1970: Aunt Mary (Polydor) gjenutgitt 1974 på Karussell som Whispering Farewell
1972: Loaded (Philips)
1973: Janus (Vertigo)
1992: Bluesprints (Sonet)
2016: New Dawn (Playground)

Compilation albums
1974: The Best of Aunt Mary (Philip)
1975: The Best of Aunt Mary Volume 2 (Philips)
2007: The Things We Stood For

Live albums
1981: Live Reunion (Philips)
2009: Barbed Wire Waves (Pan) - a radio concert recorded in 1971

Singles
(selective)
1970: "Did You Notice?"/"The Ball"
1971: "Jimi, Janis and Brian"/"Stop Your Wishful Thinking"
1971: "Whispering Farewell"/"All My Sympathy for Lily"
1972: "G Flat Road"/"Joinin' the Crowd"
1972: "Rosalind"/"In the Hall of the Mountain King"
1973: "Nocturnal Voice"/"Mr. Kaye"
2016: "Slave Parade"

References

External links
 Norwegian Progrock Discography 

Norwegian progressive rock groups
Musical groups established in 1970
1970 establishments in Norway
Musical groups disestablished in 1973
1973 disestablishments in Norway
Musical groups from Fredrikstad